Viaţa Basarabiei was a Romanian language periodical from Chişinău, Moldova.

History 
Viaţa Basarabiei was published between April 22 and May 25, 1907. It was a more moderate attempt to continue Basarabia's work. Viaţa Basarabiei was led by Alexis Nour and written in two versions: with Romanian Latin alphabet and Cyrillic alphabets, but after just six issues it also ceased its publication.

Notes

External links
  Mircea Rusnac, Renaşterea cultural-naţională a Basarabiei în perioada Ţaristă
 Digital copy of the newspaper (Cyrillic alphabet).

Magazines established in 1907
Magazines disestablished in 1907
Literary magazines published in Moldova
Controversy over ethnic and linguistic identity in Moldova
Mass media in Chișinău
Defunct literary magazines published in Europe
Defunct magazines published in Romania
Romanian-language magazines